The 2007/08 FIS Ski Jumping Continental Cup was the 17th in a row (15th official) Continental Cup winter season and the 6th summer season in ski jumping for men. This was also the 4th winter season for ladies. 

Other competitive circuits this season included the World Cup and Grand Prix.

Men

Summer

Winter

Ladies

Winter

Men's standings

Summer

Winter

Ladies' standings

Winter

Europa Cup vs. Continental Cup 
This was originally last Europa Cup season and is also recognized as the first Continental Cup season by International Ski Federation although under this name began its first official season in 1993/94.

References

FIS Ski Jumping Continental Cup
2007 in ski jumping
2008 in ski jumping